Apotropina is a genus of fruit flies in the family Chloropidae.

Species
Apotropina aequalis (Becker, 1911)
Apotropina albiseta (Malloch, 1924)
Apotropina anomala (Malloch, 1925)
Apotropina australis (Malloch, 1924)
Apotropina barberi (Sabrosky, 1951)
Apotropina bispinosa (Becker, 1911)
Apotropina bistriata Liu & Yang, 2015
Apotropina brevivenosa (Dely-Draskovits, 1977)
Apotropina brunneicosta (Malloch, 1923)
Apotropina brunneivittata Sabrosky, 1982
Apotropina brunnipennis (Meijere, 1913)
Apotropina cinerea (Meijere, 1906)
Apotropina circumdata (Duda, 1930)
Apotropina coenosioides (Frey, 1923)
Apotropina conopsea (Duda, 1934)
Apotropina costomaculata (Malloch, 1924)
Apotropina dasypleura (Malloch, 1928)
Apotropina duplicata (Malloch, 1923)
Apotropina exquisita (Malloch, 1940)
Apotropina fortis (Becker, 1916)
Apotropina fuscipleuris (Becker, 1911)
Apotropina gigantea (Becker, 1916)
Apotropina gracilis (Malloch, 1913)
Apotropina grisea (Malloch, 1934)
Apotropina griseovina (Malloch, 1936)
Apotropina hirtiventris (Malloch, 1934)
Apotropina hirtoides (Sabrosky, 1951)
Apotropina infumata (Becker, 1916)
Apotropina itascae (Sabrosky, 1951)
Apotropina japonica Kanmiya, 1983
Apotropina lachaisei Sabrosky, 1982
Apotropina lineata (Becker, 1916)
Apotropina longepilosa (Strobl, 1893)
Apotropina longipennis (Becker, 1912)
Apotropina longiprocessa Liu & Yang, 2015
Apotropina longula (Becker, 1912)
Apotropina lutea (Meijere, 1906)
Apotropina meijerei (Sabrosky, 1952)
Apotropina nagatomii Yang, Yang & Kanmiya, 1993
Apotropina nigricornis (Duda, 1930)
Apotropina nigricornis Sabrosky, 1982
Apotropina nigripila (Duda, 1934)
Apotropina nudiseta (Becker, 1911)
Apotropina ornatipennis (Malloch, 1923)
Apotropina palliata (Curran, 1926)
Apotropina pallipes (Malloch, 1940)
Apotropina panamensis (Malloch, 1934)
Apotropina parva (Malloch, 1928)
Apotropina proxima (Rayment, 1959)
Apotropina pruinosa (Thomson, 1869)
Apotropina pulchrifrons (Meijere, 1906)
Apotropina purpurascens (Malloch, 1930)
Apotropina quadriseta (Harrison, 1959)
Apotropina raymenti (Curran, 1930)
Apotropina rufescens (Duda, 1934)
Apotropina rufithorax (Duda, 1930)
Apotropina senilis (Duda, 1930)
Apotropina shewelli (Sabrosky, 1951)
Apotropina shewelliana (Spencer, 1977)
Apotropina sigalopleura Sabrosky, 1982
Apotropina sinensis Yang, Yang & Kanmiya, 1993
Apotropina speculariforns (Enderlein, 1911)
Apotropina stuckenbergi Sabrosky, 1982
Apotropina sulae (Spencer, 1977)
Apotropina taylori (Malloch, 1940)
Apotropina tomentosa Cherian, 2002
Apotropina tonnoiri (Sabrosky, 1955)
Apotropina tristriata Liu & Yang, 2015
Apotropina tsitsikama Sabrosky, 1982
Apotropina uniformis Yang, Yang & Kanmiya, 1993
Apotropina viduata (Schiner, 1868)
Apotropina virilis (Bohart & Gressitt, 1951)
Apotropina vittata (Sabrosky, 1959)
Apotropina willistoni (Sabrosky, 1951)
Apotropina wisei (Harrison, 1959)
Apotropina zeylanica (Lamb, 1918)

References

Chloropidae genera
Taxa named by Friedrich Georg Hendel
Diptera of Asia
Diptera of Europe
Diptera of North America
Diptera of Africa